Lipie  is a village in the administrative district of Gmina Czerniewice, within Tomaszów Mazowiecki County, Łódź Voivodeship, in central Poland.

The village has an approximate population of 200.

References

Villages in Tomaszów Mazowiecki County